Donell Ó Dubhda (died 1380) was King of Ui Fiachrach Muaidhe.

Annalistic references

 1371. Great depredations were omitted by O'Dowda (Donnell) in Tir-Fhiachrach Muaidhe ; the whole country was ravaged by him, and its castles were taken, namely, the castles of Ard-na-riagh and Castle-mic-Conor, and all the English that were in them were driven out; and the country was after this parcelled out amongst his kinsmen and his own people.
 1373. Brian Oge, son of Brian O'Dowda, was slain by the Barretts.
 1375. Cathal Oge, son of Cathal Oge, son of Cathal More, son of Donnell O'Conor, was slain by the Clann-Rickard. Loughlin, the son of Donough O'Dowda, was taken prisoner on this occasion.
 1380. Donnell, the son of Brian O'Dowda, Lord of Tireragh and Tirawley, who defended his territory despite of the English and Irish who were opposed to him, died in his own town on the third of May; and his son Rory assumed his place.

External links
 http://www.ucc.ie/celt/published/T100005C/index.html

References

 The History of Mayo, Hubert T. Knox, p. 379, 1908.
 Araile do fhlathaibh Ua nDubhda/Some of the princes of Ui Dhubhda, pp. 676–681, Leabhar na nGenealach:The Great Book of Irish Genealogies, Dubhaltach Mac Fhirbhisigh (died 1671), eag. Nollaig Ó Muraíle, 2004–05, De Burca, Dublin.

Monarchs from County Mayo
People from County Sligo
14th-century Irish monarchs
1380 deaths
Year of birth unknown